Adrian Mannarino was the defending champion but chose not to defend his title.

Noah Rubin won the title after defeating Taylor Fritz 7–5, 6–4 in the final.

Seeds

Draw

Finals

Top half

Bottom half

References
Main Draw
Qualifying Draw

BNP Paribas de Nouvelle-Caledonie - Singles
2018 Singles